Alexander Nollenberger (born 4 June 1997) is a German professional footballer who plays as a midfielder for  club SpVgg Bayreuth.

Career
Nollenberger made his 3. Liga debut for Bayern Munich II on 30 July 2019, coming on as a substitute in the 79th minute for Joshua Zirkzee in the away match against Hansa Rostock, which finished as a 1–2 loss.

In 2020, Nollenberger joined SpVgg Bayreuth.

Career statistics

Notes

Honours
SpVgg Bayreuth
 Regionalliga Bayern: 2021–22

References

External links
 Profile at DFB.de
 Profile at kicker.de

1997 births
Living people
People from Memmingen
Sportspeople from Swabia (Bavaria)
German footballers
Association football midfielders
FV Illertissen players
FC Bayern Munich II players
3. Liga players
Regionalliga players
SpVgg Bayreuth players
Footballers from Bavaria